Remnants of War is the second album by American Heavy metal band Helstar, released by Combat Records and Noise Records in August 1986, and the final by the former. It was recorded following a lineup change and a change of studio to Mad Dog Studios in California. The sound of the album was a gradual progression from the traditional heavy metal style of the band's debut album, Burning Star towards the power-thrash sound that the band forged throughout the 1980s.

Track listing
All tracks written by Helstar.

 "Unidos por Tristeza" - 0:48
 "Remnants of War" - 3:45
 "Conquests" - 3:47
 "Evil Reign" - 4:32
 "Destroyer" - 5:04
 "Suicidal Nightmare" - 5:20
 "Dark Queen" - 4:00
 "Face the Wicked One" - 5:16
 "Angel of Death" - 6:18

Personnel
 James Rivera - vocals
 Larry Barragan - guitars
 Rob Trevino - guitars
 Jerry Abarca - bass
 Rene Luna - drums

References

1986 albums
Helstar albums
Combat Records albums